The Turkish Journal of Urology is a quarterly peer-reviewed academic journal covering all aspects of urology. It is published by the Turkish Association of Urology and was established in 1975. The editor-in-chief is Önder Yaman (Ankara University).

Abstracting and indexing 
The journal is abstracted and indexed in Scopus, CINAHL, EBSCO databases, and ProQuest databases.

References

External links 
 

Urology journals
Quarterly journals
English-language journals
Publications established in 1975
Academic journals published by learned and professional societies